Ronan Carroll  is an Irish sportsperson. He plays Gaelic football with his local club St Mary's and was a member of the senior Louth county team from 2006. He was part of the team who lined out in the 2006 Tommy Murphy Cup and for National League Div 3 where he scored the game's only goal.

Honours
Tommy Murphy Cup (1): 2006
National Football League, Division 2 (1): 2006
National Football League, Division 3 (1): 2011

References

External links
 

Year of birth missing (living people)
Living people
Louth inter-county Gaelic footballers
St Mary's (Louth) Gaelic footballers